Warsow or Wahrsow may refer to:

Warsow (video game), a multiplayer first-person shooter computer game, first publicly released on June 8, 2005
 Warsow (Stralendorf) a municipality in Ludwigslust-Parchim District, Mecklenburg-Vorpommern, Germany
 Warsow by Lake Kummerow, a municipal neighbourhood of Malchin, Mecklenburg-Vorpommern, Germany
 Warsow, a village in Wiesenaue, Havelland District, Brandenburg, Germany
 Wahrsow, a village in Schönberger Land, Nordwestmecklenburg District, Mecklenburg-Vorpommern, Germany
 Warsow, the German name of Warszewo, a municipal neighbourhood of the city of Szczecin, Poland

See also 
 Warsaw (disambiguation)